Renhe is a town in Baiyun District, Guangzhou, Guangdong, China.

History 

Geography 

The Liuxi River flows through Renhe.

Administrative divisions 
Renhe administers 3 residential communities and 25 administrative villages.

Residential communities 
Renhe contains the following 3 residential communities:

 Renhe Community
 Banghu Community
 Suihe Community

Administrative villages 
Renhe contains the following 25 administrative villages:

 Donghua Village
 Hantang Village
 Xinxing Village
 Mingxing Village
 Minqiang Village
 Gaozeng Village
 Renhe Village
 Xicheng Village
 Aigang Village
 Fenghe Village
 Hengli Village
 Gangwei Village
 Fangshi Village
 Daxiang Village
 Taicheng Village
 Yahu Village
 Xiushui Village
 Heting Village
 Huangbangling Village
 Xinlian Village
 Zhenhu Village
 Qinghe Village
 Nanfang Village
 Xihu Village
 Jiannan Village

Demographics 
Per the 2010 Chinese Census, Renhe has a population of 127,795.

About 76,000 overseas Chinese hail from Renhe, including those living in Hong Kong, Macau, and Taiwan.

Education 
The town is home to 1 secondary school, 5 middle schools, 11 primary schools, and 2 adult schools.

Transportation 
Guangzhou Baiyun International Airport is partially located in the northern portion of Renhe.

References 

Baiyun District, Guangzhou
Towns in Guangdong